Anjana Bhowmik is an actress of  Bengali cinema from the 1960s until the 1980s. She was born in Cooch Behar. Her real name is Arati Bhowmik and nickname Babli. Her father was Bibhuti Bhusan Bhowmik. She spent her school days in Cooch Behar. She passed the Higher Secondary Exam of West Bengal Board from Suniti Academy of Cooch Behar in 1961. After that she also studied in Sarojini Naidu College, an undergraduate college, then affiliated with the University of Calcutta.

She made her film debut at the age of 20 in the 1964 film "Anustup Chanda" directed by Pijush Bose. Before releasing the film she changed her name to Anjana from Arati. She became popular with the release of her first film. Her acting talent was praised by both audiences and critics. She became one of the major heroines of Uttam Kumar. She and Uttam Kumar gave major hits like Chowringhee, "Kokhono Megh", "Nayika Sangbad", "Roudra Chhaya", "Raj Drohi". At a certain time of her career when critics predicted she wouldn't be successful without Uttam Kumar as hero, she paired with Soumitra Chattopadhyay in the highly acclaimed "Mahashweta".

Anjana married Navy Officer Anil Sharma and is now settled in Mumbai. Her daughters are Nilanjana Sharma and Chandana Sharma
 are also actresses. The older one, Nilanjana Sharma is married to Bengali Actor Jishu Sen Gupta.

Filmography

References

External links

Anjana Bhowmik on gomolo

Living people
Actresses in Bengali cinema
University of Calcutta alumni
Indian film actresses
20th-century Indian actresses
Year of birth missing (living people)